Gillette is an unincorporated community located within Long Hill Township in Morris County, New Jersey, United States. The area is served as United States Postal Service ZIP code 07933.

As of the 2000 United States Census, the population for ZIP Code Tabulation Area 07933 was 3,278; In the 2010 Census, Gillette had a population of 3,251.

Demographics

Parks and recreation
Gillette's Riverside Park was renamed Matthew G. Kantor Memorial Park in 2013, to honor Navy SEAL Matthew Kantor, who had been killed while serving in Afghanistan.

Gallery

Notable people

People who were born in, residents of, or otherwise closely associated with Gillette include:
 Jessie Baylin (born 1984), singer-songwriter.
 Lorinda Cherry (1944-2022), computer scientist and programmer.

See also
Gillette station

References

External links

Census 2000 Fact Sheet for Zip Code Tabulation Area 07933 from the United States Census Bureau

Long Hill Township, New Jersey
Unincorporated communities in Morris County, New Jersey
Unincorporated communities in New Jersey